Kajaanselkä Basin is a lake basin of north-west Lake Vesijärvi in Lahti in southern Finland, in the Päijänne Tavastia region. The mean depth of the lake basin is 17 metres.
The basin suffered severe effects of eutrophication in the 1960s and a restoration programme began in the 1970s.

Drainage basins of Finland